Attilio Bignasca (1 November 1943 – 29 March 2020) was a Swiss politician and a member of the Ticino League. He was the brother of Giuliano Bignasca. He was elected to the National Council, and represented the Canton of Ticino between 1991 and 2019.

References

1943 births
2020 deaths
Members of the National Council (Switzerland)
People from Lugano District
Ticino League politicians